ISO/IEC 7810 Identification cards — Physical characteristics is an international standard that defines the physical characteristics for identification cards.

The characteristics specified include:
 Physical dimensions
 Resistance to bending, chemicals, temperature, and humidity
 Toxicity

The standard includes test methods for resistance to heat.

Card sizes

The standard defines four card sizes: ID-1, ID-2, ID-3 and ID-000.

All card sizes have a thickness of  minimum and  maximum.

The standard defines both metric and imperial measurements, noting that:

ID-1

It is commonly used for payment cards (ATM cards, credit cards, debit cards, etc.). Today it is also used for driving licences and personal identity cards in many countries, automated fare collection system cards for public transport, in retail loyalty cards, and even crew member certificates (particularly for aircrew).

ID-2

This size is the A7 format. The ID-2 format is used, for example, for visas. It is used for the  Romanian identity card, and was also used by the German identity card issued until October 2010 and French up to July 2021. German ID cards (since November 2010) and French ID cards (since August 2021) are issued in the ID-1 format more widely used in Europe for national ID cards. ID-2 was previously also used for Finnish and Swedish drivers' licences before those changed to the ID-1 format.

ID-3

This size is the B7 format. This format is commonly used for passport booklets.

ID-000

The ID-000 size was first defined by ENV 1375–1, Identification card systems — Intersector integrated circuit(s) card additional formats — Part 1: ID-000 card size and physical characteristics.

This size is used for the "mini-SIM" format of subscriber identity modules.

ID-000 size card as part of ID-1 size card
An "informative" (i.e. non-mandatory) annex describes how an ID-000 sized card may be included in an ID-1 size card for processing (e.g. in an ID-1 reader), but with "relief areas around the perimeter of the ID-000 size card to allow it to be removed from the ID-1 size card without punching tools". An ID-1 size card containing an ID-000 size card is denoted as ID-1/000.

Card characteristics
The standard specifies requirements for such physical characteristics as:
 Bending stiffness
 Toxicity
 Resistance to chemicals
 Card dimensional stability and warpage with temperature and humidity
 Resistance to deterioration from exposure to light and heat
 Durability

See also
 ISO/IEC 7811 defines traditional techniques for recording data on ID-1 identification cards, namely embossed characters and several different magnetic recording formats.
 ISO/IEC 7816 defines ID-1 identification cards with an embedded chip (smartcard) and contact surfaces for power, clock, reset and serial-data signals.
 Machine-readable passport (ICAO 9303) defines machine-readable text on ID-1, ID-2, and ID-3 travel documents.
 Magnetic stripe card
 MM Code

References

External links 
 ISO/IEC 7810:2019-12 

Identity documents
07810